Rancho Santa Margarita is a city in Orange County, California, United States. One of Orange County's youngest cities, Rancho Santa Margarita is a master-planned community. The population was 47,853 at the 2010 census, up from 47,214 at the 2000 census. Although it is named for Rancho Santa Margarita y Las Flores, which was in San Diego County, the city limits fall within the borders of Rancho Mission Viejo. At 20 characters long (22 including spaces), it is the longest city name in California.

History

The area is the ancestral lands of the Juaneño Band of Mission Indians, Acjachemen Nation. The village of Alume was located in Rancho Santa Margarita, between Trabuco Creek and Tijeras Creek. In 1810, the Trabuco Adobe was constructed near the village as an outpost of Mission San Juan Capistrano. 

The city seal has the brands of Rancho Mission Viejo and Rancho Santa Margarita and Las Flores on the border, with artwork containing Santiago Peak in the background. The tower in the foreground symbolizes the Rancho Santa Margarita Lake Tower.

Hughes Aircraft Company's Microelectronic Systems Division moved to Rancho Santa Margarita in May 1988 from Irvine. In August 1992, the Hughes plant closed its facilities and moved the division to Carlsbad, California due to budget constraints in the aerospace industry.

Rolling Hills Estates had the longest city name in California with 19 letters until January 1, 2000, when the title was ceded to Rancho Santa Margarita (20 letters) upon the latter's incorporation.

The City is a general law city and operates under the council-manager form of government. Rancho Santa Margarita is a contract city. Police services are provided through contract with the Orange County Sheriff. Fire Protection services are provided through the Orange County Fire Authority.

Geography
Rancho Santa Margarita is located at  (33.641518, -117.594524). It occupies much of a high plateau known as Plano Trabuco.

Rancho Santa Margarita is bordered by the city of Mission Viejo on the west, the census-designated Coto de Caza and Las Flores on the south, Trabuco Canyon on the north, and the Cleveland National Forest on the east.

Vehicular access is provided by California State Route 241 (a toll road), in addition to several surface streets.

Major homeowners associations and communities
The majority of the neighborhoods in Rancho Santa Margarita are maintained by larger homeowners associations including SAMLARC, Dove Canyon, Rancho Cielo, Robinson Ranch, Walden and Trabuco Highlands. Dove Canyon, Trabuco Highlands, Robinson Ranch, Walden and Rancho Cielo were all established before Rancho Santa Margarita was an incorporated community. East of Plano Trabuco Road is designated with a Trabuco Canyon (92679) zip code even though the area falls within the City of Rancho Santa Margarita boundary.

Climate

Rancho Santa Margarita, like most of southern California, generally has a Mediterranean climate.

Economy

Top employers
According to the City's 2020 Comprehensive Annual Financial Report, the top 10 employers in the city are:

Demographics

2020
The 2020 United States Census reported a population of 48,119. The racial makeup was 75.5% White, 2.2% African American, 10.9% Asian, and 21.7% Hispanic or Latino of any race.

2010
The 2010 United States Census reported that Rancho Santa Margarita had a population of 47,853. The racial makeup of Rancho Santa Margarita was 37,421 (78.2%) White (67.0% Non-Hispanic White), 887 (1.9%) African American, 182 (0.4%) Native American, 4,350 (9.1%) Asian, 102 (0.2%) Pacific Islander, 2,674 (5.6%) from other races, and 2,237 (4.7%) from two or more races. Hispanic or Latino of any race were 8,902 persons (18.6%).

31.8% of the population possessed a bachelor's degree, with 16.4% possessing a Graduate or Professional Degree.  The educational attainment level in Rancho Santa Margarita significantly exceeds the averages throughout the rest of California.

The Census reported that 47,851 people (100% of the population) lived in households, 2 (0%) lived in non-institutionalized group quarters, and 0 (0%) were institutionalized.

There were 16,665 households, out of which 7,699 (46.2%) had children under the age of 18 living in them, 10,144 (60.9%) were opposite-sex married couples living together, 1,703 (10.2%) had a female householder with no husband present, 700 (4.2%) had a male householder with no wife present.  There were 747 (4.5%) unmarried opposite-sex partnerships, and 103 (0.6%) same-sex married couples or partnerships. 3,199 households (19.2%) were made up of individuals, and 761 (4.6%) had someone living alone who was 65 years of age or older. The average household size was 2.87.  There were 12,547 families (75.3% of all households); the average family size was 3.33.

The population was spread out, with 13,879 people (29.0%) under the age of 18, 3,793 people (7.9%) aged 18 to 24, 13,706 people (28.6%) aged 25 to 44, 13,764 people (28.8%) aged 45 to 64, and 2,711 people (5.7%) who were 65 years of age or older. The median age was 36.0 years. For every 100 females, there were 95.6 males.  For every 100 females age 18 and over, there were 92.1 males.

The homeowner vacancy rate was 1.2%; the rental vacancy rate was 5.6%. 35,737 people (74.7% of the population) lived in owner-occupied housing units and 12,114 people (25.3%) lived in rental housing units.

During 2009–2013, Rancho Santa Margarita had a median household income of $104,113, with 3.9% of the population living below the federal poverty line.

Government and politics

State and federal representation 

According to the California Secretary of State, as of February 10, 2019, Rancho Santa Margarita has 28,462 registered voters. Of those, 11,877 (41.73%) are registered Republicans, 7,511 (26.39%) are registered Democrats, and 7,819 (27.47%) have no political party preference/are independents.

Rancho Santa Margarita has voted Republican in every presidential election since the city's incorporation, although Donald J. Trump came quite close to losing the city in his reelection bid in 2020 to Joe Biden.

Education
The city is served by Saddleback Valley Unified School District and the Capistrano Unified School District.
Students in SVUSD boundaries attend Trabuco Hills High School or Mission Viejo High School, both outside of Rancho Santa Margarita in the city of Mission Viejo. Students in CUSD boundaries attend Tesoro High School located in the Las Flores neighborhood.
 RSM Intermediate School (SVUSD) and Las Flores Middle School (CUSD) serve the city.
 Public Elementary schools include Cielo Vista, Trabuco Mesa, Robinson Ranch, Arroyo Vista, Melinda Heights, and Tijeras Creek.
 Private Elementary and Middle Schools include St. John's Episcopal Day School, Serra Catholic, and Mission Hills Christian School.
Santa Margarita Catholic High School is a private Roman Catholic high school associated with the Catholic Diocese of Orange. SMCHS is located in Rancho Santa Margarita.

Popular culture

Television
The television series The Real Housewives of Orange County, although based in Coto De Caza, is mainly filmed in Rancho Santa Margarita where many of the housewives do business, shopping, commuting, dentistry, and dining.

The city's name often creates confusion: people in the Las Flores, Dove Canyon, Rancho Cielo, or Robinson Ranch neighborhoods, for example, can receive mail addressed to them at Rancho Santa Margarita, Dove Canyon, Coto de Caza, Robinson Ranch or Trabuco Canyon. This is due to them all having the same ZIP code: 92679, although the 92688 ZIP code is far more common in the Rancho Santa Margarita area.

A map of Orange County seen in season four of Arrested Development places the fictional Bluth Company-developed community of Sudden Valley northeast of Mission Viejo and Las Flores, in the approximate location of Rancho Santa Margarita.

Notable people

Jonathon Blum (born 1989), National Hockey League player, 2018 Winter Olympian 
 Joy Fawcett, Olympic soccer gold medalist
 Warren G, rapper and producer
 Carson Palmer, American football player; attended Santa Margarita Catholic High School
 Mark Sanchez (born 1986), National Football League quarterback
 Teemu Selänne, ice hockey player
 Klay Thompson, basketball player; attended Santa Margarita Catholic High School
 Members of the band Movements.
 Velvet Revolver, rock band

See also
Coto De Caza

References

External links

2000 establishments in California
Cities in Orange County, California
Former census-designated places in California
Incorporated cities and towns in California
Populated places established in 2000